Karvir may refer to:

Karvir (town), a town in Maharashtra, India
Karvir (clan), a clan of Jats in India